Pollokshaws West railway station is a railway station in Glasgow, Scotland. The station is managed by ScotRail and is served by trains on the Glasgow South Western Line.

History 
The station was opened as Pollokshaws on 27 September 1848 by Glasgow, Barrhead and Neilston Direct Railway, which later became the Glasgow, Barrhead and Kilmarnock Joint Railway - a joint railway company between the Caledonian Railway and the Glasgow and South Western Railway. To the south west is Busby Junction where the Busby Railway (latterly part of the Caledonian Railway) diverges. Following grouping, the station became part of the London Midland and Scottish Railway.

It was not until British Railways days - 5 May 1952 - that the station was renamed as Pollokshaws West. The station buildings are now protected as a category B listed building.

Services 
On Sundays, there are half hourly services to Glasgow Central, with hourly services to East Kilbride and Kilmarnock. There is no Barrhead service on Sundays, as Kilmarnock trains operate all stops. Additionally, one Kilmarnock service extends to Carlisle on Sundays only.

The station is an interchange station for services between the East Kilbride line, and the Barrhead line, with trains extending to Kilmarnock and a few trains a day to Dumfries as well as a weekly service to Carlisle.

Pollokshaws West is the nearest station to the Burrell Collection and Pollok House (approximately 10 minutes' walk).

References

Notes

Sources

External links
 RAILSCOT on Glasgow, Barrhead and Neilston Direct Railway
 RAILSCOT on Busby Railway

Railway stations in Glasgow
Former Glasgow, Barrhead and Kilmarnock Joint Railway stations
Railway stations in Great Britain opened in 1848
SPT railway stations
Railway stations served by ScotRail
Category B listed buildings in Glasgow
Listed railway stations in Scotland
Pollokshaws